Behompy is a rural municipality in Madagascar. It belongs to the district of Toliara II, which is a part of Atsimo-Andrefana Region. The population of the commune was estimated to be approximately 7,000 in 2001 commune census.

Primary and junior level secondary education are available in town. The majority 90% of the population of the commune are farmers, while an additional 7% receives their livelihood from raising livestock. The most important crops are maize and beans; also cassava is an important agricultural product. Services provide employment for 3% of the population.

References 

Populated places in Atsimo-Andrefana